Pancrase: Yes, We Are Hybrid Wrestlers 3 was a mixed martial arts event held by Pancrase Hybrid Wrestling. It took place at Kobe World Commemoration Hall in Kobe, Japan on November 8, 1993.

Background 
The main event featured Pancrase co-founder Masakatsu Funaki face-off against Cees Bezems. Also on the card was Ken Shamrock, who took on Takaku Fuke. The event also saw the Pancrase debut of former WKA World Kickboxing Heavyweight Champion Maurice Smith in a kickboxing bout against Minoru Suzuki. After the main event had been stopped, both Funaki and Bezems continued to argue & face off, with Funaki claiming Bezems had used closed fists during the fight.

Results

See also 
 Pancrase
 List of Pancrase champions
 List of Pancrase events
 1993 in Pancrase

References

External links 
 Sherdog.com event results
 Official Pancrase Website

1993 in mixed martial arts
Mixed martial arts in Japan
Sport in Kobe
1993 in Japanese sport
Pancrase events